is a passenger railway station in the city of Jōsō, Ibaraki Prefecture, Japan operated by the private railway company Kantō Railway.

Lines

Station layout
The station consists of a single side platform serving traffic in both directions. There is no station building but only a waiting room on the platform. The station is unattended.

Adjacent stations

History
Tamamura Station was opened on 5 November 1931 as a station on the Jōsō Railroad, which became the Kantō Railway in 1965. The station building was rebuilt in July 1967.

Passenger statistics
In fiscal 2017, the station was used by an average of 87 passengers daily).

Surrounding area
The station is located in a rural area surrounded by fields, with few houses or other buildings in the vicinity.

See also
 List of railway stations in Japan

References

External links

 Kantō Railway Station Information 

Railway stations in Ibaraki Prefecture
Railway stations in Japan opened in 1931
Jōsō, Ibaraki